Tritia vaucheri is a species of sea snail, a marine gastropod mollusc in the family Nassariidae, the nassa mud snails or dog whelks.

Description
The shell grows to a length of 12 mm.

Distribution
This species occurs in the Alboran Sea, Western Mediterranean Sea.

References

 Pallary, P. (1906). Diagnoses de nouvelles coquilles du Maroc. privately printed 3 pp.
 Hoenselaar H. J. & Moolenbeek R. G., 1988: The identity of Nassarius vaucheri (Pallary, 1906) (Gastropoda Prosobranchia), Basteria 52: 45–47
 Gofas, S.; Le Renard, J.; Bouchet, P. (2001). Mollusca, in: Costello, M.J. et al. (Ed.) (2001). European register of marine species: a check-list of the marine species in Europe and a bibliography of guides to their identification. Collection Patrimoines Naturels, 50: pp. 180–213

External links
 Pallary P., 1920: Exploration scientifique du Maroc organisée par la Société de Géographie de Paris et continuée par la Société des Sciences Naturelles du Maroc. Deuxième fascicule. Malacologie (1912) Larose, Rabat et Paris pp. 34, 1 pl., 1 map 
 Gofas, S.; Luque, Á. A.; Templado, J.; Salas, C. (2017). A national checklist of marine Mollusca in Spanish waters. Scientia Marina. 81(2) : 241-254, and supplementary online material.
 

vaucheri
Gastropods described in 1906